Ana José Nacho is a compilation album by the group Mecano. It was released in 1998, and was produced by the group itself. There are two editions: Spain and France. It includes 8 new songs by the brothers Cano: José and Nacho; these tracks were recorded in CTS Studios and Belsize Park in London; and Red Led and Eurosonic in Madrid.

Spain edition 
This edition was presented in 2 CDs. The Spanish release includes eight new songs, six of which were culled out from the group's previous work, the album Aidalai; the other two are new versions of their successful song "Aire" (Air) and the song named  "El club de los humildes" (The club of the humble ones).

The other six "new" songs are "Cuerpo y corazón" (Body and heart) that talks about the world of prostitution; "Otro muerto" (Another dead person) that shows different interpretations around the theme of death and terrorism; "Stereosexual", a story about a man questioning his sexuality (It was censored in some countries of Latin America), "El mundo futuro" (The future world) exhibits a concern for a life and feelings increasingly material and superficial; "Esto no es una canción" (This is not a song) tells a tragic story about how drug addiction is destroying the life of a man; and "Los piratas del amor" (Pirates of love) tells the experiences of men who are promiscuous and womanizers.  An altered version of this song entitled "Canción de los piratas" (Song of the Pirates) was released as a single; this altered version featured child-friendly lyrics and was written for Telecinco's "Club Disney" container program.

The sleeve was designed by Ian Ross for Bill Smith Studio. Photography by David Scheinmann.

Track listing 

 Disc 1
 Cuerpo y corazón
 Otro muerto
 El club de los humildes
 Aire (otra versión)
 Un año más
 Naturaleza muerta
 Hoy no me puedo levantar
 Dalí
 El 7 de septiembre
 Me cuesta tanto olvidarte
 La fuerza del destino
 No es serio este cementerio
 Hermano sol, hermana luna
 Una rosa es una rosa
 Maquillaje
 Hijo de la luna

 Disc 2
 Stereosexual
 El mundo futuro
 Esto no es una canción
 Los piratas del amor
 El uno, el dos, el tres
 Barco a Venus
 Cruz de navajas
 Ay, qué pesado
 No hay marcha en Nueva York
 Perdido en mi habitación
 Hawaii-Bombay
 Dalai Lama
 Mujer contra mujer
 Me colé en una fiesta

French edition 
The French edition of this compilation, on a single disc, was released simultaneously with the Spanish one. It includes six new songs in Spanish, the French version of three of them, and a collection of songs from previous albums sung in French.

The three new songs in French are "Le club des modestes" (The club of the humble ones), "Corps et coeur" (Heart and body) and "Frère Soleil, Soeur Lune" (Brother Sun, Sister Moon). "Encore un mort" (Another dead person) was not included due to a last-minute error by the composer, but was recorded and released as a B-side single. The tracks were recorded in London.

Track listing 
Tracks:
 Une femme avec une femme
 Hijo de la Luna (Dis-moi Lune d'argent)
 Dalai Lama
 No Hay Marcha en Nueva York
 Le Club des modestes
 Otro Muerto
 Toi
 1 histoire à 3
 Corps & Coeur
 Le 7 septembre
 Stereosexual
 Esto No es Una Canción
 El Mundo Futuro
 Los Piratas del Amor
 El Blues del Esclavo
 Frère Soleil, sœur Lune
 Aire (Nouvelle version)

Charts

Album charts 

 Note: This release reached the #10 position in Latin Pop Albums Billboard staying for 10 weeks  and it reached the #28 position in the Billboard Top Latin Albums staying for 1 weeks in the chart.

Single charts

Certifications

References 

1998 compilation albums
Mecano albums
Sony BMG compilation albums